Royal Infantry Corps may refer to:
 Royal Australian Infantry Corps
 Royal Canadian Infantry Corps